TV Rey de Occidente S.A. de C.V. or simplified TV Rey, is a Mexican telecommunications company in the triple play, has a presence in Western Mexico, covering the south of Jalisco, Central-West Michoacán and Querétaro.

History 
The company began operations in 1995 in Sahuayo, Michoacán, starting as a cable television provider, between 2005 and 2008 it would enter the fixed telephony market, at that time they would expand to the center-west of Michoacán, in 2010 they would enter the Internet service market on those dates it would install its branches in Querétaro, in total having coverage in three states.

Services and subsidiaries  
The company offers Internet services at 10 to 100 mbps, including cable television and fixed telephony, also includes business package.

Subsidiaries 
 Ilox Telecomunicaciones
 ONtv
 TV Net
 TV 5
 TV Phone

Coverage 
Michoacán
Sahuayo de Morelos
Jiquilpan de Juárez
Cojumatlán de Régules
San Pedro Cahro
Pajacuarán
San José de Gracia
Guarachita
Cumuatillo
Jalisco
Zapopan, Guadalajara
Mazamitla
Tizapan el Alto
Querétaro
San Juan del Río
Ezequiel Montes
Bernal

See also 
 izzi Telecom
 Totalplay
 Megacable

References

External links 
  

Companies of Mexico
Telecommunications companies of Mexico
Internet service providers of Mexico
Cable television companies of Mexico